Thanh Vân may refer to several rural communes in Vietnam, including:

Thanh Vân, Bắc Giang, a commune of Hiệp Hòa District
Thanh Vân, Hà Giang, a commune of Quản Bạ District
Thanh Vân, Phú Thọ, a commune of Thanh Ba District
Thanh Vân, Vĩnh Phúc, a commune of Tam Dương District